The train of thought or track of thought refers to the interconnection in the sequence of ideas expressed during a connected discourse or thought, as well as the sequence itself, especially in discussion how this sequence leads from one idea to another.

When a reader or listener "loses the train of thought" (i.e., loses the relation between consecutive sentences or phrases, or the relation between non-verbal concepts in an argument or presentation), comprehension is lost of the expressed or unexpressed thought.

The term "train of thoughts" was introduced and elaborated as early as in 1651 by Thomas Hobbes in his Leviathan, though with a somewhat different meaning (similar to the meaning used by the British associationists):

See also

 Absent-mindedness
 Association of Ideas
 Associationism
 Derailment (thought disorder)
 Internal monologue
 Mind-wandering
 Stream of consciousness

References

Logic
Cognition
Consciousness studies